First Creek is a stream in eastern Iron and western St Francois counties in the U.S. state of Missouri. It is a tributary of the St. Francis River. The stream source area lies northwest of Middlebrook and the stream flows northeast to north paralleling Missouri Route W. Just southwest of Iron Mountain the streamcourse veers northwest and re-enters Iron County to its confluence with the St. Francis.

First Creek was named for the fact it is the first in order of tributaries relative to nearby Second Creek.

See also
List of rivers of Missouri

References

Rivers of Iron County, Missouri
Rivers of St. Francois County, Missouri
Rivers of Missouri